Robert Scannewin (born 5 October 1985) is a German footballer who currently plays for FV Dresden 06.

References

External links

1985 births
Living people
German footballers
Dynamo Dresden players
Dynamo Dresden II players
Bayer 04 Leverkusen II players
RB Leipzig players
2. Bundesliga players

Association football midfielders
Footballers from Dresden